Vasile Duță (July 2, 1955 – May 20, 2016) was a Romanian politician. He was a member of the Senate (2000–2004) for Bihor County. Initially affiliated with the Greater Romania Party, he served as an independent from May 2001 through December 2002, and then through October 2004 with the Social Democrats, after which he reverted to an independent. 

In 2010, Duță was convicted of influence peddling and received a five-year sentence.

See also 
List of corruption scandals in Romania

References

External links 
Vasile Duță on Chamber of Deputies official site.

1955 births
2016 deaths
Romanian politicians convicted of corruption
21st-century Romanian politicians
Greater Romania Party politicians
Social Democratic Party (Romania) politicians
Members of the Senate of Romania